Mompha miscella is a moth in the family Momphidae, found in  Asia Minor, Europe and North Africa.

Description
The wingspan is 7–9 mm. There are two generations per year with adults on wing from the end of April to the beginning of October.

The larvae feed on rock rose (Cistus species), white rock-rose (Helianthemum apenninum), hoary rock-rose (Helianthemum oelandicum) and common rock-rose (Helianthemum nummularium), mining the leaves of their host plant. The mine has the form of a corridor which is densely packed with frass. It suddenly widens into a blotch that may occupy the whole width of the leaf and overruns the initial corridor. In the blotch, the frass is either dispersed or clumped. The larvae may leave the mine and restart elsewhere. Larvae can be found from October to April and from June to July. Pupation takes place outside of the mine within a cocoon in soil litter.

Distribution
Mompha miscella is found in most of Europe through to Asia Minor and North Africa. In the north, it is also found in the southern part of Fennoscandia.

References

External links
Ian Kimber: Guide to the moths of Great Britain and Ireland
Lepiforum e. V.

Momphidae
Leaf miners
Moths described in 1775
Moths of Africa
Moths of Asia
Moths of Europe
Taxa named by Michael Denis
Taxa named by Ignaz Schiffermüller